Tughlakabad village is one of the oldest urban Village in South East District of New Delhi.
The Village is named after Ghiyas-ud-din  Tughlaq. The Village is located in the shadows of 700 year old Ruins of Tughlaqabad Fort.

History
As per the historians once Saint Nizamuddin Aulia was angry with the Emperor Mohammad Bin Tughlaq, he cursed him by saying "Ya Rahe Ujar, Ya Base Gurjar"
Bidhuri Clan of Gurjar Community are descendants of Raja Bhoj Parmar, in the Year 1325, In the Regime of Ghyas-Ud-Din Tughlak,  One Baba Dillu Bidhuri was Given 60% area in the Village for his Living around 700 years ago
Raja Devi Singh along with all villagers from Tughlaqabad Village also participated in 1857 Revolution against the Britishers. Raja Devi Singh was hanged in chandni Chowk Kotwali after the revolution and 2800 bigha Land of the Village was forfeited by the Britishers

Demographics
Tughlakabad Village is dominated by Bidhuri clan of Gurjar Community. There are six Mohalla's of Bidhuri namely Bhangar Mohalla, Churiya Mohalla, Kuan Mohalla, Jalam Mohalla, Bazar Mohalla, NauGhara Mohalla and One Mohalla of Kangar Clan of Gurjar Community. 
At the time of Partition some Sikh families also moved to Tughlakabad Village from Pakistan, Their Mohalla is known as Sardar Mohalla.
The Village is situated in the Fort of Tughlaqabad and it is at Mehrauli Badarpur Road.

Administration & Politics
 Tughlakabad Village Comes under South Delhi (Lok Sabha constituency), Ramesh Bidhuri is the MP from this area
 in assembly Tughlakabad Village Comes under Tughlakabad (Delhi Assembly constituency) of Delhi Legislative Assembly, Ch. Sahi Ram is Current MLA from this Area
 South Delhi Municipal Corporation have jurisdiction over Tughlaqabad Village. Suman Bidhuri is the Councillor from this ward
 Tughlaqabad Village Comes under South East District and its subdivision is Kalkaji.

Landmarks
 Ravidas Temple
 Tughlaqabad Fort

Notable people
 Achal Singh Gurjar, 1857 Freedom Fighter 
 Ramvir Singh Bidhuri, Leader of Opposition in Delhi Assembly and 4 Times Badarpur MLA
 Rajendra Singh Bidhuri, 2 Times MLA from Begun, Rajasthan

References

Villages in South East District Delhi